Dino Mennillo (born 22 August 1975) is an Australian soccer player (retired) and occupational therapist.

Career
Mennillo started his senior career with Adelaide City in the National Soccer League (NSL) in 1994. In 1999, Mennillo moved to the Football Kingz where he played 14 matches before leaving as a result of a payment dispute in early 2000. He was signed by NSL team Wollongong Wolves. In 2001, Mennillo signed for English club Walsall, however he was released a week later without playing a match. He joined Kallithea in the Football League Greece, where he made three appearances. After that, he played for Australian club Wollongong City before retiring in 2003.

Occupational therapy 
Mennillo studied occupational therapy at the University of South Australia between 1994 and 1998; gaining a Bachelor of Applied Science (B.A.Sc.) Occupational Therapy.  

He is a paediatric Occupational Therapist, specialising in Sensory Integration® developed by Anna Jean Ayres.  Mennillo is the owner and Director of Clinical Services of the OTFC Group, a private clinic in Adelaide and Occupational Therapy for Children Plus (OTFC+) a facility for adolescents and young adults with Autism Spectrum Disorder.

References

External links 
 Interview with Dino Mennillo 
 Soccer: Kingz bring zing to Aussies 
 at OzFootball 
 YouTube Occupational Therapy For Children: Dino's Story 

Expatriate footballers in Greece
Expatriate footballers in England
Australian soccer players
Living people
1975 births
Bradford City A.F.C. players
Wollongong Wolves FC players
Australian people of Italian descent
Australian expatriate soccer players
Australian expatriate sportspeople in England
Association football midfielders
Kallithea F.C. players
Adelaide City FC players
Walsall F.C. players
Association football wingers
Occupational therapists